A Company Level Intelligence Cell is a United States Marine Corps program that both pushes down 0231  Marine Corps Intelligence Specialists from their Battalion S-2 down to the rifle companies while simultaneously augmenting them with selected 0311 Infantry who can conduct basic intelligence work. While intelligence Marines were pushed down to the company level as individual augments before the conception of the cell, there was no formal naming convention or organization for individual augments.  Marine Corps Interim Publication (MCIP) 2-1.01, Company Level Intelligence Cell, establishes the doctrinal basis for the planning and execution of intelligence support to operations at the company level.

Organization 
An article in the Marine Corps Gazette in August 2015 by LtCol Dinsmore and Capt Gowan stated: “The intelligence T/O at an infantry battalion consists of 3 officers and 13 enlisted Marines. The enlisted T/O includes one gunnery sergeant, two sergeants, and six corporals. The remainder are lance corporal and below. The basic CLIC is manned by one intelligence corporal (0231) and one infantry Marine (03XX) at the company headquarters. Some battalions further augment company intelligence with 03XX Marines at the platoon level. These company and platoon 03XX Marines are provided individual intelligence training and operate under the supervision and mentorship of the 0231 CLIC chief. Given today’s potential number of collections assets under an infantry company’s control, this basic CLIC T/O is indispensable. Beyond basic reporting, map tracking, and briefing/debriefing skills, the CLICs are trained in TSE, long-range high-frequency radio operations, and in intelligence collections and targeting. An independently operating CLIC in an EF 21 CLT would likely carry additional demands and require a more experienced Marine. The current battalion section T/O, however, is likely sufficient for the employment of CLICs in conventional offensive, defensive, and amphibious missions, as well as for task-organization in support of disaggregated CLT or other independent operations.”

Other services 
Other land services have similar programs, as a result of the innovations of the OIF and OEF. Junior officers in both British Army and US Army have published professional articles describing this innovation. In the British and USA incarnations, though, the cell is fully internal to the Co unit, drawing only soldiers inside the company with no augmentation from the parent Battalion S-2.

These junior officers have recommended that the FO lieutenant take on the duty of the Co S-2 Officer in Charge, and find smart soldiers to staff the cell. They also recommend that the CO rotate in squad leaders and team leaders from the line infantry squads, to get a fresh perspective. The OIC should also accompany patrols sometimes to understand what he is studying.

Analysis 
The primary analysis technique is link analysis.  Over time, the Co and the cell need to build up a dossier on all of the leaders in the AO, major and minor.  Primarily, the cell is trying to understand the political power structure in the area, who's in charge, who are the kingmakers, etc.  Imagine that the cell is a new reporter reporting on the municipal election of "No-Where, Kansas".  The cell should be able to answer, "Who is likely to win the election?" "Why would he win?" "Who are the moon-shiners 'round these parts?" "What are the vendettas here?" "What are some of the past scandals and issues that bear on this election?"  That's the level of detail they need to get to.  They are trying to figure out who are hostile, who will attack the Coalition Forces.

The cell should also keep the census record of the area.  Otherwise, how will they figure out if "Ahmed" just moved into the village, or if he has lived there the whole time? 

If an HTT passes through the Co's AO, the OIC need to talk to them and compare notes.  The cell can help HTT focus their work and maximize their productivity; HTT can help the cell figure out the gaps in their intelligence, and answer some of their mysteries.

Ideally, the Co's predecessors have passed down their intelligence/targeting dossier, so the cell wouldn't have to start from scratch.  If they haven't, then the cell need to start cranking.

References 
Corps creates intel cells at rifle-company level
 Creating Intelligence, Neil Garra, http://www.s2company.com/index.php?topic=4
 Company-Level Intelligence Cell, Training and evaluation at Talon Reach V: “all-in” for intelligence integration at the company level, by Maj Brendan Heatherman, MCIS Staff, and MCWL Staff, https://web.archive.org/web/20151208145235/https://www.mca-marines.org/gazette/2015/08/company-level-intelligence-cell 
 Company-Level Intelligence Cell, Next Generation, Major Mark Schaefer, https://web.archive.org/web/20150710011920/https://www.mca-marines.org/gazette/2015/07/clic-next-generation 
 The CLIC in EF 21, Perspective from the GCE, LtCol Jeffrey Dinsmore and Capt Caleb Gowan, https://web.archive.org/web/20151208173749/https://www.mca-marines.org/gazette/2015/08/clic-ef-21
 MCIP 2-1.01  http://www.marines.mil/LinkClick.aspx?fileticket=I6KLcKFwR2c%3D&portalid=59

External links 
How to Use CLIC

Military units and formations of the United States Marine Corps
Military intelligence
Combat support occupations
Army Military Intelligence